Orange Is the New Black (sometimes abbreviated to OITNB) is an American comedy-drama streaming television series created by Jenji Kohan for Netflix. The series is based on Piper Kerman's memoir Orange Is the New Black: My Year in a Women's Prison (2010), about her experiences at FCI Danbury, a minimum-security federal prison. Produced by Tilted Productions in association with Lionsgate Television, Orange Is the New Black premiered on Netflix on July 11, 2013. Its seventh and final season was released on July 26, 2019.

As of 2016, Orange Is the New Black was Netflix's most-watched as well as its longest-running original series. It was widely acclaimed throughout its run, and received many accolades. For its first season, the series garnered 12 Emmy Award nominations, including Outstanding Comedy Series, Outstanding Writing for a Comedy Series, and Outstanding Directing for a Comedy Series, winning three. A new Emmy rule in 2015 forced the series to change categories from comedy to drama. For its second season, it received four Emmy nominations, including Outstanding Drama Series, and Uzo Aduba won for Outstanding Supporting Actress in a Drama Series. Orange Is the New Black is the first series to score Emmy nominations in both comedy and drama categories. The series also received six Golden Globe Award nominations, six Writers Guild of America Award nominations, a Producers Guild of America Award, an American Film Institute award, and a Peabody Award.

Plot

The series begins revolving around Piper Chapman (Taylor Schilling), a 33 year old woman living in New York City who is sentenced to 15 months in Litchfield Penitentiary, a minimum-security women's federal prison in Upstate New York. Chapman was convicted of transporting a suitcase full of drug money for her girlfriend Alex Vause (Laura Prepon), an international drug smuggler. The offense had occurred 10 years before the start of the series and in that time Chapman had moved on to a quiet, law-abiding life among New York's upper middle class. Her sudden and unexpected indictment disrupts her relationships with her fiancé, family, and friends. In prison, Chapman is reunited with Vause (who named Chapman in her trial, resulting in Chapman's arrest), and they re-examine their relationship. Simultaneously, Chapman, along with the other inmates, attempt to grapple with prison's numerous, inherent struggles. Episodes often feature flashbacks of significant events from various inmates' and prison guards' pasts. These flashbacks typically depict how an inmate came to be in prison or develop a character's backstory. The prison is initially operated by the "Federal Department of Corrections" (a fictional version of the Federal Bureau of Prisons), and was in a later season acquired by the Management & Correction Corporation (MCC), a private prison company.

The fifth season shows the prisoners revolting against the guards, wardens, and the system after MCC's failed handling of an inmate's death at the hands of a guard in the fourth season. The inmate death had followed a peaceful protest and subsequent instigation of an inmate fight by another guard. Fueled by the conditions the inmates are forced to tolerate, as well as grudges against the prison guards, a three-day riot ensues. During the riot, some inmates attempt to negotiate better living conditions and seek justice for the death of the inmate, while others pursue their own interests and entertainment, and a few seek no involvement. At the emergence of the riot, the guard who incited the fight in the prior season is critically wounded by an inmate who took the gun the guard illegally brought into the prison. At the end of the season, SWAT raids the prison to end the riot and remove all inmates from the facility. During this raid, a correctional officer is fatally wounded by a corrupt "strike team", which then conspires to blame the guard's death on a number of inmates who hid in an underground bunker, found by one inmate, and had taken the guard hostage. All inmates are transported to other prisons.

The consequences of the riot are shown in the sixth season. A number of the inmates, including Chapman and Vause, are transported to Litchfield Maximum Security. Most of these inmates are interrogated, and several of them charged and sentenced for their involvement in the riot. In max, new inmates are introduced, alliances are made, and a gang-like war emerges between two prison blocks, spearheaded by a longstanding feud between two sisters and a grudge harbored by them toward a former maximum-security inmate who returned as a consequence of the riot (she had been moved to the minimum security prison). Inmates who arrived from the minimum security prison are either caught up or willingly participate in the war between prison blocks. The season portrays further corruption and guard brutality.

The seventh season provides an ending to various inmates' stories. Chapman and Vause continue their on/off again relationship. The season shows how some prisoners are able to move beyond their time in prison while others are captured by the system and through their own flaws and/or systemic problems in the structure of US society and its justice system are unable to progress. In addition to the established setting of Litchfield Max, a significant portion of the season takes place in a newly created ICE detention center for detained presumed undocumented immigrants, showing their struggles and lack of access to outside help in large part because of complete or extreme disregard of the law.

In each season, the series shows how various forms of corruption, funding cuts by the corporate owner to increase profits by millions, privatization of prison, overcrowding, guard brutality, and racial discrimination (among other issues) affect the prisoners' safety, health, and well-being. One of the show's key conflicts involves the minimum-security prison's Director of Human Activities ( the warden, under privatization nomenclature), Joe Caputo, whose efforts and aims as a warden constantly conflict with the corporate interests of MCC, which acquires Litchfield Penitentiary as it risks closure. This theme is continued when a new forward-thinking and caring warden is hired at Litchfield Maximum Security and unlike Caputo, actually institutes educational programs and positive changes. She is fired for these actions and her attitude toward the corporate corruption, although her short-lived changes have profound results.

Cast and characters

Main cast

 Taylor Schilling as Piper Chapman
 Laura Prepon as Alex Vause, inmate  
 Michael Harney as Sam Healy, correctional officer 
 Michelle Hurst as Miss Claudette Pelage, inmate 
 Kate Mulgrew as Galina "Red" Reznikov, inmate
 Jason Biggs as Larry Bloom, Piper's fiancé 
 Uzo Aduba as Suzanne "Crazy Eyes" Warren, inmate 
 Danielle Brooks as Tasha "Taystee" Jefferson, inmate 
 Natasha Lyonne as Nicky Nichols, inmate 
 Taryn Manning as Tiffany "Pennsatucky" Doggett, inmate 
 Selenis Leyva as Gloria Mendoza, inmate 
 Adrienne C. Moore as Cindy "Black Cindy" Hayes, inmate 
 Dascha Polanco as Dayanara "Daya" Diaz, inmate 
 Nick Sandow as Joe Caputo, Captain of the Guard, later warden 
 Yael Stone as Lorna Morello, inmate 
 Samira Wiley as Poussey Washington, inmate 
 Jackie Cruz as Marisol "Flaca" Gonzales, inmate 
 Lea DeLaria as Carrie "Big Boo" Black, inmate 
 Elizabeth Rodriguez as Aleida Diaz, former inmate 
 Jessica Pimentel as Maria Ruiz, inmate 
 Laura Gómez as Blanca Flores, inmate 
 Matt Peters as Joel Luschek, correctional officer 
 Dale Soules as Frieda Berlin, inmate 
 Alysia Reiner as Natalie "Fig" Figueroa, warden

Recurring cast

Inmates

 Laverne Cox as Sophia Burset 
 Diane Guerrero as Maritza Ramos 
 Annie Golden as Norma Romano 
 Vicky Jeudy as Janae Watson 
 Julie Lake as Angie Rice 
 Emma Myles as Leanne Taylor 
 Abigail Savage as Gina Murphy 
 Constance Shulman as Yoga Jones 
 Lori Tan Chinn as Mei Chang 
 Tamara Torres as Emily "Weeping Woman" Germann 
 Lin Tucci as Anita DeMarco 
 Beth Fowler as Sister Jane Ingalls 
 Barbara Rosenblat as Rosa "Miss Rosa" Cisneros 
 Madeline Brewer as Tricia Miller 
 Kimiko Glenn as Brook Soso 
 Lori Petty as Lolly Whitehill 
 Lorraine Toussaint as Yvonne "Vee" Parker 
 Blair Brown as Judy King 
 Emily Althaus as Maureen Kukudio 
 Ruby Rose as Stella Carlin 
 Daniella De Jesus as Irene "Zirconia" Cabrera 
 Shannon Esper as Alana Dwight 
 Rosal Colon as Carmen "Ouija" Aziza 
 Francesca Curran as Helen "Skinhead Helen" Van Maele 
 Kelly Karbacz as Kasey Sankey 
 Amanda Stephen as Alison Abdullah 
 Asia Kate Dillon as Brandy Epps 
 Miriam Morales as Ramona "Pidge" Contreras 
 Jolene Purdy as Stephanie Hapakuka 
 Shirley Roeca as Juanita Vasquez 
 Rebecca Knox as Tina Swope 
 Sipiwe Moyo as Adeola Chinede 
 Besanya Santiago as Raquel "Creech" Munoz 
 Finnerty Steeves as Beth Hoefler 
 Christina Toth as Annalisa Damiva 
 Amanda Fuller as Madison "Badison" Murphy 
 Vicci Martinez as Dominga "Daddy" Duarte 
 Mackenzie Phillips as Barbara "Barb" Denning 
 Henny Russell as Carol Denning 
 Ismenia Mendes as Tali Grapes

Staff

 Catherine Curtin as Wanda Bell 
 Joel Marsh Garland as Scott O'Neill 
 Brendan Burke as Wade Donaldson 
 Pablo Schreiber as George "Pornstache" Mendez 
 Lolita Foster as Eliqua Maxwell 
 Germar Terrell Gardner as Charles Ford 
 Matt McGorry as John Bennett 
 Lauren Lapkus as Susan Fischer 
 Kaipo Schwab as Igme Dimaguiba 
 James McMenamin as Charlie "Donuts" Coates 
 Alan Aisenberg as Baxter "Gerber" Bayley 
 Jimmy Gary Jr. as Felix Rikerson 
 Mike Birbiglia as Danny Pearson 
 Marsha Stephanie Blake as Berdie Rogers 
 Beth Dover as Linda Ferguson 
 Nick Dillenburg as Ryder Blake 
 Mike Houston as Lee Dixon 
 Emily Tarver as Bambi "Artesian" McCullough 
 Brad William Henke as Desi Piscatella 
 Evan Arthur Hall as B. Stratman 
 John Palladino as Josh 
 Michael Torpey as Thomas "Humps" Humphrey 
 Hunter Emery as Rick Hopper 
 Shawna Hamic as Virginia "Ginger" Copeland 
 Susan Heyward as Tamika Ward 
 Josh Segarra as Danilo Stefanovic 
 Greg Vrotsos as Greg Hellman 
 Nicholas Webber as J. Alvarez 
 Branden Wellington as Jarod Young 
 Adam Lindo as Carlos "Clitvack" Litvack

Others

 Michael Chernus as Cal Chapman 
 Tanya Wright as Crystal Burset 
 Berto Colon as Cesar Velazquez 
 Deborah Rush as Carol Chapman 
 Tracee Chimo as Neri Feldman 
 Maria Dizzia as Polly Harper 
 Ian Paola as Yadriel 
 John Magaro as Vince Muccio 
 Mary Steenburgen as Delia Mendez-Powell 
 Miguel Izaguirre as Dario "Diablo" Zúñiga 
 Michael J. Burg as Detective Mark Bellamy 
 Bill Hoag as Bill Chapman 
 Karina Arroyave as Karla Córdova 
 Melinna Bobadilla as Santos Chaj 
 Marie-Lou Nahhas as Shani Abboud 
 Alicia Witt as Zelda 
 Alysia Joy Powell as Wyndolyn Capers

Episodes

Production

Show creator Jenji Kohan read Piper Kerman's memoir after a friend sent it to her. She then set up a meeting with Kerman to pitch her on a TV adaptation, which she notes she "screwed up" as she spent most of the time asking Kerman about her experiences she described in the book rather than selling her on the show. This appealed to Kerman as it let her know that she was a fan and she signed off on the adaptation. Kohan would later go on to describe the main character, Piper Chapman, as a "trojan horse" for the series, allowing it to focus on characters whose demographics would not normally be represented on TV. Its budget was estimated to cost $4 million per episode.

In July 2011, it was revealed that Netflix was in negotiations with Lionsgate for a 13-episode TV adaptation of Kerman's memoirs with Kohan as creator. In November 2011, negotiations were finalized and the series had been greenlit. Kohan had initially wanted to cast Katie Holmes in the role of Piper Chapman, and met with the actress to discuss it, but Holmes had other commitments. Casting announcements began in August 2012 with Taylor Schilling, the first to be cast, as Piper Chapman, followed by Jason Biggs as Piper's fiancé Larry Bloom.

Laura Prepon and Yael Stone were next to join the series, as Alex Vause and Lorna Morello, respectively. Abigail Savage, who plays Gina, and Alysia Reiner, who plays Fig, had auditioned for role of Alex Vause. Prepon initially auditioned for Piper Chapman, however Kohan felt she would not worry about her [in prison], noting a "toughness and a presence to her that wasn't right for the character." Kohan instead gave her the role of Alex. Stone had originally auditioned for the role of Nicky Nichols, but she was not considered "tough enough" for the character; she was asked to audition for Lorna Morello instead. Likability was important for Morello, whom casting director Jen Euston deemed "a very helpful, nice, sweet Italian girl." Natasha Lyonne was to audition for Alex, but was asked to read for the character Nicky Nichols; "[Kohan knew] she could do Nicky with her eyes closed. She was perfect," said Euston. Laverne Cox, a black transgender woman, was cast as Sophia Burset, a transgender character. The Advocate touted Orange Is the New Black as possibly the first women-in-prison narrative to cast a transgender woman for this type of role. Uzo Aduba read for the part of Janae Watson but was offered the character Suzanne "Crazy Eyes" Warren. Taryn Manning was offered the role of Tiffany "Pennsatucky" Doggett. This American Life host Ira Glass was offered a role as a public radio host, but he declined. The role instead went to Robert Stanton, who plays the fictional host Maury Kind.

Orange is the New Black is set in a fictional minimum-security prison in Litchfield, New York, which is a real town in the southern tier of New York, but it does not have a federal penitentiary. The series began filming in the former Rockland Children's Psychiatric Center in Rockland County, New York, on March 7, 2013. The building, part of the what was then the Rockland State Hospital campus, was completed in 1970 and closed by 2010. The title sequence features close-up shots of female non-actors who were formerly prisoners, including Kerman herself; she is the one who blinks.

On June 27, 2013, prior to the series' premiere, Netflix renewed the show for a second season consisting of 13 episodes. For the second season, Uzo Aduba, Taryn Manning, Danielle Brooks, and Natasha Lyonne were promoted to series regulars. Laura Prepon did not return as a series regular for a second season because of scheduling conflicts, but returned for season 3 as a regular. On May 5, 2014, the series was renewed for a third season, as revealed by actress Laura Prepon. For the third season, several actors were promoted to series regulars, including Selenis Leyva, Adrienne C. Moore, Dascha Polanco, Nick Sandow, Yael Stone, and Samira Wiley. Both Jason Biggs and Pablo Schreiber were confirmed as not returning for the third season, but Schreiber appeared in the 10th episode of the third season. The series was renewed for a fourth season on April 15, 2015, prior to its third-season release. For the fourth season, Jackie Cruz and Lea DeLaria were promoted to series regulars; with Elizabeth Rodriguez also being promoted by the season's sixth episode. On February 5, 2016, the series was renewed for a fifth, sixth and seventh season. In season six, Dale Soules, Laura Gómez, and Matt Peters were promoted to series regulars. On October 17, 2018, Netflix announced that the seventh season would be the series' last and would be released on July 26, 2019.

In 2018, Lionsgate Television were discussing "a potential sequel" to the series.

Reception

Critical response

Orange Is the New Black was widely acclaimed throughout its run. It has been particularly praised for humanizing prisoners and for its depiction of race, sexuality, gender and body types.

The first season received positive reviews from critics. Review aggregator Metacritic gave it a weighted average score of 79/100 based on reviews from 32 critics, indicating favorable reviews. On Rotten Tomatoes, season one has a 95% approval rating based on 57 reviews, with an average rating of 8.3/10. The site's critical consensus is "Orange Is the New Black is a sharp mix of black humor and dramatic heft, with interesting characters and an intriguing flashback structure."

Hank Stuever, television critic for The Washington Post, gave Orange Is the New Black a perfect score. In his review of the series, he stated: "In Jenji Kohan's magnificent and thoroughly engrossing new series, Orange Is the New Black, prison is still the pits. But it is also filled with the entire range of human emotion and stories, all of which are brought vividly to life in a world where a stick of gum could ignite either a romance or a death threat." Maureen Ryan, of The Huffington Post, wrote: "Orange is one of the best new programs of the year, and the six episodes I've seen have left me hungry to see more."

The second season received critical acclaim. Rotten Tomatoes gave a rating of 96%, with an average rating of 9.2/10 based on 53 reviews. The site's critical consensus reads: "With a talented ensemble cast bringing life to a fresh round of serial drama, Orange Is the New Black's sophomore season lives up to its predecessor's standard for female-led television excellence." Metacritic gave the second season a score of 89/100 based on 31 critics, indicating "universal acclaim." David Wiegland of the San Francisco Chronicle gave the season a positive review, calling the first six episodes "not only as great as the first season, but arguably better." James Poniewozik, writing for Time, noted how the show "had expanded its ensemble so far beyond Piper", also stating that "Larry [and] every element of Piper’s life and family outside the prison needs to go", because of the show "not [being] interested in giving them the same depth of characterization it gives to the rest of its prisoners and even its prison guards".

The third season also received critical acclaim. On Metacritic, it has a score of 83/100 based on 24 reviews. On Rotten Tomatoes, it has a 95% rating with an average score of 8.1/10 based on 64 reviews. The site's critical consensus reads: "Thanks to its blend of potent comedy and rich character work, Orange is the New Black remains a bittersweet pleasure in its third season." Richard Lawson from Vanity Fair gave the season a positive review, stating that the season "may find the walls closing in on many characters, but the show feels as boundless and free as it ever has". Spencer Kornhaber from The Atlantic stated that Piper Chapman's scenes "once felt obligatory by mere dint of the fact that they powered the show’s plot, but now they mainly allow Taylor Schilling to demonstrate her comedic chops". Anne Cohen from The Forward said the season used "traditionally anti-Semitic tropes", while Nathan Abrams from Haaretz described a "remarkably upbeat and positive representation of Judaism".

The fourth season received critical acclaim. On Metacritic, it has a score of 86/100 based on 19 reviews. On Rotten Tomatoes, it has a 94% rating with an average score of 8.6/10 based on 52 reviews. The site's critical consensus reads: "Orange is the New Black is back and better than ever, with a powerful fourth season full of compelling performances by the ensemble cast." James Poniewozik of The New York Times reviewed the fourth season as "Do you measure the quality of a TV season as a beginning-to-end average or by how well it ends? By the first yardstick, Season 4 is ambitious but uneven; by the latter, it's the series' best." Karol Collymore from Bitch magazine praised the show's past seasons for its representation of women of color, while criticizing the fourth season due to the "visceral racist acts" and racial slurs that occur "constantly, in every episode", stating that "it felt exhausting". The Hindustan Times praised the season for how it dealt with the topic of rape, while negatively describing the new characters as "mere one-dimensional fillers". IGN gave the season a positive review, describing it as "dramatic and insightful".

The fifth season received "generally favorable reviews". On Metacritic, it has a score of 67/100 based on 20 reviews. On Rotten Tomatoes, it has a 71% rating with an average score of 7.3/10 based on 49 reviews. The site's critical consensus reads: "Orange Is the New Blacks fifth season offers up more of the sharp writing and dizzying tonal juggling acts that fans expect – albeit somewhat less successfully." Chris Orstendorf from The Daily Dot gave the season a positive review, although negatively describing "the decision to tell the entire story of season 5 in the span of three days". Emily James from Vox rated the season 3.5/5, praising the "stronger focus" compared to "the scattered nature of seasons three and four", and criticizing the season for having "[often] desperately cut to something that’s supposed to be funny, and it will only be so in theory". Rafael Gonzaga from Omelete rated the season four out of five star, calling the fourth season better although still praising the fifth.

The sixth season received positive reviews from critics, with many critics noting its improvement over the previous season. On Metacritic, it has a score of 69/100 based on 14 reviews. On Rotten Tomatoes, it has an 85% rating with an average score of 7.3/10 based on 39 reviews. The site's critical consensus reads: "Brutality and humor continue to mesh effectively in a season of Orange Is the New Black that stands as a marked improvement from its predecessor, even if some arcs are more inspired than others." PinkNews praised the season's "unlikely pairings of existing characters who have barely had so much as a scene together previously".

The seventh season has a score of 81/100 on Metacritic based on 12 reviews. On Rotten Tomatoes, it has a 98% rating with an average score of 7.8/10 based on 44 reviews. The site's consensus reads: "Carried by its exceptional ensemble, Orange Is the New Blacks  final season gets straight to the point, tackling hard-hitting issues with the same dramatic depth and gallows humor that made the show so ground-breaking to begin with".

In 2019, Orange Is the New Black was ranked 58th on The Guardians list of the 100 best TV shows of the 21st century.

Accolades

Orange Is the New Black has received many accolades since its debut. The series has garnered 16 Emmy Award nominations and four wins. For its first season, it received 12 Emmy Award nominations, including Outstanding Comedy Series, Outstanding Writing for a Comedy Series, and Outstanding Directing for a Comedy Series, winning three. Taylor Schilling received a Golden Globe Award nomination for Best Actress in a Television Series – Drama. In 2013, the American Film Institute selected the series as one of the Top 10 Television Programs of the Year.

A new Emmy rule in 2015, classifying half-hour shows as comedies and hour-long shows as dramas, forced the series to change categories from comedy to drama for its second season. That year, the series received four Emmy nominations, including Outstanding Drama Series, and Aduba won her second Emmy Award, for Outstanding Supporting Actress in a Drama Series. Orange Is the New Black became the first series to receive Emmy nominations in both comedy and drama categories. For its second season, the series also received three Golden Globe Award nominations: Best Television Series – Musical or Comedy, Best Actress – Television Series Musical or Comedy for Schilling, and Best Supporting Actress – Series, Miniseries or Television Film for Aduba. At the 21st Screen Actors Guild Awards, the series won Outstanding Performance by an Ensemble in a Comedy Series and Aduba won Outstanding Performance by a Female Actor in a Comedy Series.

For its third season, Orange Is the New Black won Screen Actors Guild Awards for Outstanding Performance by an Ensemble in a Comedy Series and Outstanding Performance by a Female Actor in a Comedy Series (Aduba). It received a Golden Globe Award nomination for Best Television Series – Musical or Comedy. The series has also received, among other accolades, six Writers Guild of America Award nominations, five Satellite Awards, four Critics' Choice Television Awards, a GLAAD Media Award, an American Cinema Editors Award, a Producers Guild of America Award, and a Peabody Award.

Broadcast

The series began airing on broadcast television in New Zealand, on TV2, on August 19, 2013. It premiered in Australia on October 9, 2013, on Showcase. The second season began on Showcase on July 16, 2014, and the third season premiered on June 11, 2015. The first season began airing on broadcast television in the UK on Sony Channel from April 19, 2017. It has been shown in Ireland on TG4 since January 15, 2018.

Cybercriminal hacking
In April 2017, it was reported that a cybercriminal had stolen the first ten episodes of season 5, in a security breach of a post-production company. Netflix failed to respond to ransom demands, and the cybercriminal leaked the episodes online. Netflix confirmed the security breach and an ongoing investigation by federal law enforcement. Multichannel News reported that demand for the series significantly increased over the seven-day period following the leak of the episodes. It was also said that the leak would likely cause a decrease in demand for the fifth season when Netflix released it in June 2017.

Ratings
Orange Is the New Black generated more viewers and hours viewed in its first week than the other top Netflix original series House of Cards and Arrested Development. In October 2013, Netflix stated that the show is a "tremendous success" for the streaming platform. "It will end the year as our most watched original series ever and, as with each of our other previously launched originals, enjoys an audience comparable with successful shows on cable and broadcast TV." As reported in February 2016, Orange Is the New Black remained Netflix's most-watched original series. In 2016, a New York Times study of the 50 TV shows with the most Facebook Likes found that Orange Is the New Black is one of the shows most watched in urban areas, and despite its "minority-rich ensemble cast", the series "appeals more to a white audience".

See also
 Incarceration of women in the United States
 List of dramatic television series with LGBT characters
 List of LGBT characters in television and radio
 Prison–industrial complex
 Prisoner

Notes

References

Further reading

External links

 
2013 American television series debuts
2019 American television series endings
2010s American black television series
2010s American LGBT-related comedy television series
2010s American LGBT-related drama television series
2010s prison television series
American black television series
Bisexuality-related television series
Federal American minimum security prisons in fiction
Hispanic and Latino American television
Imprisonment and detention of women in the United States
Lesbian-related television shows
Nonlinear narrative television series
Outstanding Performance by an Ensemble in a Comedy Series Screen Actors Guild Award winners
Peabody Award-winning television programs
Primetime Emmy Award-winning television series
Serial drama television series
Shorty Award winners
Television series about illegal drug trade
Television series by Lionsgate Television
Television shows based on non-fiction books
Television shows featuring audio description
Television shows filmed in New York (state)
Television shows set in New York City
Television series created by Jenji Kohan
Transgender-related television shows